Auratonota aurochra is a species of moth of the family Tortricidae which is endemic to Ecuador.

The ground colour of the forewings is cream, strongly suffused with golden yellow between the markings. These markings are black with ochreous parts. The hindwings are whitish, tinged with brownish in the terminal part.

Etymology
The species name refers to the colour of the markings and is derived from Latin aureus (meaning golden, ochreous).

References

External links

Moths described in 2006
Endemic fauna of Ecuador
aurochra
Moths of South America
Taxa named by Józef Razowski